Yashashri Masurkar is an Indian television actress and voice actor. She is best known for playing the role of Khanak in Rang Badalti Odhani on STAR One. Yashashri  has appeared in several shows such as Sanskaar - Dharohar Apnon Ki, Chakravartin Ashoka Samrat and Krishnadasi. Currently, she can be seen on Bigg Boss Marathi 4 as a participant.

Career
Masurkar made her acting debut in Marathi series Laxman Resha. She rose to popularity as Khanak in Rang Badalti Odhani where her chemistry with Karan Tacker garnered attention. Soon after the series came to closure, she bagged the role of Mrignayani in Chandragupta Maurya on NDTV Imagine which she quit shortly after.

Post a short stint on Sanskaar - Dharohar Apnon Ki, she joined the cast of Do Dil Bandhe Ek Dori Se. Her negative role in the show generated angry reactions from viewers.

In 2015, she was roped in to play Agnishikha in Chakravartin Ashok Samrat. Later, she appeared in Krishnadasi and several other shows in supporting cast.

Currently, Yashashri can be seen on Bigg Boss Marathi 4.

Filmography

Film
 2016 Laal Ishq as Nisha
 2021 Kabaad: The Coin as Savita

Television

References

External links
 

Living people
Indian television actresses
Indian soap opera actresses
Indian voice actresses
1986 births
Bigg Boss Marathi contestants